Hemileuca nuttalli, or Nuttall's sheep moth, is a moth in the family Saturniidae. It is found from south-eastern British Columbia to eastern Washington, eastern Oregon, north-eastern California, Idaho, Nevada, northern Arizona, Utah, Montana, Wyoming, Colorado and north-western New Mexico. The species was first described by Ferdinand Heinrich Hermann Strecker in 1875 under the name Pseudohazis nuttalli.

Identification
The wingspan is 60–65 mm. The forewings are yellowish on the bottom, gradually morphing into white on the top. The veins are black at the tips and there is a black eyespot on each wing with a white center. The hindwings are yellow orange with black-tipped veins and a thick black stripe that curves through the middle of the wing, up through the forewings. There is a small black eyespot in the middle of each wing. The body is yellow orange.

Life history
The eggs are laid in rings around small twigs of the host plant. The larvae have been recorded feeding on Purshia tridentata, Symphoricarpos species and Ribes species. The larvae are black and are covered with yellow spines that will sting on contact with skin.

References

Moths of North America
Hemileucinae
Moths described in 1875